Ilıpınar can refer to:

 Ilıpınar, Atkaracalar
 Ilıpınar, Taşova